Susan Higginson is an Australian politician and a former public interest environmental lawyer. She has been a Greens member of the New South Wales Legislative Council since 12 May 2022, when she filled a casual vacancy caused by the resignation of David Shoebridge.

Background
Higginson graduated with Bachelor of Laws, with First Class Honours and was awarded the University Medal upon graduation. She then practiced as a public interest environmental lawyer, and was a Principal Solicitor and CEO of the Environmental Defenders Office. She has also lectured and taught environmental law in universities across the state.

Political career
Higginson was the Greens' candidate for the seat of Lismore in the 2019 NSW election.  She obtained 24% of first preference votes, and only missed being in the last two candidates in the distribution of preferences by 361 votes.
In February 2022, Higginson was chosen by The Greens to fill the upcoming vacancy for David Shoebridge, who would be resigning from the New South Wales Legislative Council to contest the May federal election. Shoebridge resigned in April 2022, and Higginson was appointed as a member of the Legislative Council on 12 May 2022.

Personal life
Higginson and her partner have a farm on the Richmond Floodplain in the Northern Rivers.

References

Year of birth missing (living people)
Living people
Members of the New South Wales Legislative Council
Australian Greens members of the Parliament of New South Wales
21st-century Australian politicians
21st-century Australian women politicians